Thudaka Peak is the highest mountain of the Thudaka Range of the Cassiar Mountains in the Northern Interior of British Columbia, Canada, located between the heads of Obo River and Frog River. Glaciers exist on Thudaka's northern flanks, but the zone is usually quite dry.

See also
 List of Ultras of North America

References

Sources
 
 Thudaka Peak in the Canadian Mountain Encyclopedia
 "Thudaka Mountain, British Columbia" on Peakbagger

Two-thousanders of British Columbia
Stikine Ranges
Cassiar Land District